The 2019 Oyo State House of Assembly election was held on March 9, 2019, to elect members of the Oyo State House of Assembly in Nigeria. All the 32 seats were up for election in the Oyo State House of Assembly. PDP won 26 seats, APC won 5 seats, while ADP won 1 seat.

Upon the opening of the 9th State House of Assembly, Debo Ogundoyin (PDP-Ibarapa East) was elected as Speaker of the House while Abiodun Mohammed Fadeyi (PDP-Ona Ara) and Adedoyin Onaolapo Sanjo (PDP-Ogbomoso South) became Deputy Speaker and House Leader, respectively.

Results

Ibarapa East 
PDP candidate Debo Ogundoyin won the election.

Ibadan North I 
PDP candidate Oyekunle Fola won the election.

Ona Ara 
PDP candidate Abiodun Mohammed Fadeyi won the election.

Oluyole 
PDP candidate Francis Adetunji won the election.

Ibadan South West II 
PDP candidate Oluwafemi Fowokannu won the election.

Ido 
PDP candidate Mobaje Razak won the election.

Ibadan North West 
PDP candidate Akeem Obadara won the election.

Akinyele I 
PDP candidate Fatokun Ayotunde won the election.

Saki East/Atisbo 
PDP candidate Saminu Riliwan Gbadamosi won the election.

Ibarapa North/Central 
PDP candidate Ojedokun Peter Gbadegesin won the election.

Egbeda 
PDP candidate Babalola Olasunkanmi Samson won the election.

Irepo/Olorunsogo 
PDP candidate Fatokun Ayotunde Olajide won the election.

Ibadan North East I 
PDP candidate Olagoke Olamide Francis won the election.

Ibadan North East II 
PDP candidate Owolabi Olusola Adewale won the election.

Ibadan South East II 
PDP candidate Popoola Ademola Olusegun won the election.

Kajola 
PDP candidate Mustapha Akeem Olawale won the election.

Iseyin/Itesiwaju 
PDP candidate Adeola Bamidele won the election.

Iwajowa 
PDP candidate Adedibu Hakeem Adeshina won the election.

Ibadan South East I 
PDP candidate Rasak Ademola Abdulahi won the election.

Lagelu 
PDP candidate Olajide Akintunde Emmanuel won the election.

Ogbomoso South 
PDP candidate Onaolapo Sanjo won the election.

Orelope 
PDP candidate Adewunmi Lateef Olayiwola won the election.

Akinyele II 
PDP candidate Kehinde Olatunde Taofik won the election.

Ibadan North II 
PDP candidate Adebayo Babajide Gabriel won the election.

Saki West 
PDP candidate Femi Julius Okeyoyin won the election.

Ibadan South West I 
PDP candidate Yusuf Adebisi won the election.

Afijio 
APC candidate Seyi Adisa won the election.

Oyo East/Oyo West 
APC candidate Isiaka Kazeem Tunde won the election.

Oriire 
APC candidate Bamigboye Jacob Abidoye won the election.

Ogo-Oluwa/Surulere 
APC candidate Oyeleke Simeon Adegbola won the election.

Atiba 
APC candidate Alarape Ashimiyu Niran won the election.

Ogbomoso North 
ADP candidate Wunmi Oladeji won the election.

References 

Oyo
Oyo State elections